Le Muséon: Revue d'Études Orientales (The Muséon: Journal of Oriental Studies) is a peer-reviewed academic journal of Linguistics and Oriental Studies. It was established in 1881 by Charles de Harlez, subsidised by the government of Belgium and the Catholic University of Leuven. The journal is published biannually by Peeters Publishers. Articles are in English, French, German, or Italian. The editor-in-chief is Andrea Schmidt.

Abstracting and indexing 
The journal is abstracted and indexed in:

External links 
 
 An archived copy of volume XXXIII (1915–1916) of Le Muséon

Linguistics journals
Area studies journals
Biannual journals
Publications established in 1881
Multilingual journals
Peeters Publishers academic journals
1881 establishments in Belgium